The Clouds were a Greater Manchester-based indie band signed to Chris and Julia Nagle's 'Wobble Records'. They recorded a John Peel session in 1991 and appeared live on
Mark Radcliffe's 'Hit the North' BBC Radio 5 show in the same year. The band received some regional and national radio airplay and appeared live as a support act with World of Twist (1991), Intastella (1991) and Flowered Up (1991) as well as in their own right at venues in the North West. For the duration of the time they were signed to Wobble Records, the band were made up of;
 Simon Dickinson (Lead Vocal / Guitar)
 Simon Maguire (Guitar)
 Timothy Jones (Bass Guitar)
 Dave Drennan (Keyboards)
 Simon Moss (Percussion)

Early years
The band was formed after the three remaining members of the 'Dillen Experience' Tim Jones, Simon Moss and Simon Dickinson were joined by Ex 'Dillen Experience', 'Rig' and 'Resonance' keyboard player Dave Drennan. They were joined by Simon Maguire (previously in Sale band 'The Sewage') shortly afterwards.  They signed to Wobble Records following regular plays of a demo featuring "Moon Llama" to clients and staff at Strawberry Studios where Dave Drennan was employed. Three of the group were called Simon, which led to an array of obligatory pseudonyms, including Vincent Van Void, Sonic Windpipe, Balloon, Doctor Kecks, Bruce Starbuck, The Beast and Jimmy Goggles.

Releases 
Two EPs were released on Wobble Records; "Moon Llama" and the follow up "Bingo Clubs Millennium Ball"

The band also recorded tracks for an album that was never released; "Poll Tax Blues", "Druids Sacrifice of the Autumnal Equinox", "Osmosis" and "Touch of the Sun".

Courtesy of Wobble Records, vocalist and guitarist Simon Dickinson also played guitar and sang on the Mighty Force track "Playbeast" which featured on their 1992 album, Hypnovel.

The "Moon Llama EP" was recorded in down time at Strawberry Studios in Stockport. "Bingo Clubs Millennium Ball EP" was recorded at Courtyard Studios in Stockport.

The band stopped playing live and recording in 1992. They got together again circa 1997 for a one-off show at the Roadhouse in Manchester. This line-up did not feature rhythm guitarist Simon Maguire or keyboard player Dave Drennan, but did include Eldon Snelgrove (real name) on percussion and keyboards. They then re-formed briefly in 2012, playing four shows; at the North London Tavern (Kilburn, London), Power's Bar (Kilburn, London), Affstock (Chelmsford) and the Ruby Lounge (Manchester). The only absentee from the 2012 line-up was Simon Maguire.

Current activity
Following the demise of the Clouds, Simon Dickinson went on to form Buzzwagon with bass player Tim Jones and ex 'This Years Blonde' drummer Eldon Snelgrove, re-recording The Clouds' "Touch of the Sun". Simon Dickinson now writes and records as Hamfist and collaborates with drummer Simon Moss who records in his own right as Sonic Windpipe.

References
New Musical Express, 10 August 1991, Page 6 
City Life Magazine, 29 August - 11 September 1991, Page 29 
Ett Noll Ett, Issue 17, 1992, Page 35, Swedish 
Melody Maker (Gig Review - Manchester Boardwalk), 29 June 1991, Page 16 
Melody Maker (The Clouds), 27 April 1991, Page 12, Author: John Robb 
Melody Maker (Gig Review, Leeds Duchess of York), 31 August 1991, Page 27 
City Life Magazine (EP Review), 20 May - 4 June 1992, Author Chris Sharrat 
Manchester Evening News (Sun Shining on the Clouds), 23 May 1992 
New Musical Express (But Cirrusly), 13 July 1991, Page 8, Author: Penny Anderson 
New Musical Express (EP Review), 27 July 1991, Page 22 
International Musician, Volume 17 - No 11, October 1991, Page 7 
Manchester METRO News (As Lonely as a Cloud), 5 June 1992, Page 33 
Manchester Evening News (Clouds Control), 12 July 1991, Page 12, Author: Terry Christian 
When Does the Mind Bending Start? The Life and Times of World of Twist, July 2022, Page 231, Author Gordon King (ISBN 978-1-788-70538-7)

External links

Musical groups from Greater Manchester
Musical quintets